Patharia is a town and a nagar panchayat in Damoh district in the Indian state of Madhya Pradesh. During World War II, the town served as the training camp for what would become Wingate's Chindits.

Demographics

As of the 2011 Census of India, Patharia is a Nagar Panchayat city in district of Damoh, Madhya Pradesh. The Patharia city is divided into 15 wards for which elections are held every 5 years. The Patharia Nagar Panchayat has population of 21,026 of which 11,008 are males while 10,018 are females as per report released by Census India 2011. 

Population of Children with age of 0-6 is 2987 which is 14.21 % of total population of Patharia (NP). In Patharia Nagar Panchayat, Female Sex Ratio is of 910 against state average of 931. Moreover Child Sex Ratio in Patharia is around 926 compared to Madhya Pradesh state average of 918. Literacy rate of Patharia city is 82.39 % higher than state average of 69.32 %. In Patharia, Male literacy is around 89.53 % while female literacy rate is 74.52 %. 

Patharia Nagar Panchayat has total administration over 4,317 houses to which it supplies basic amenities like water and sewerage. It is also authorize to build roads within Patharia Nagar Panchayat limits and impose taxes on properties coming under its jurisdiction.

Education
For higher secondary education, there is the government school named School Of Excellence Patharia.

For higher education, there is Madhav Rao Sapre Government College Patharia.

References

Damoh